Täsch railway station is a metre gauge railway station serving the municipality of Täsch, in the Canton of Valais, Switzerland.  It forms part of the Brig-Visp-Zermatt railway (BVZ), which connects the car-free mountaineering and ski resort of Zermatt with standard gauge lines at Visp (served by SBB-CFF-FFS) and Brig (served by SBB-CFF-FFS and BLS AG).

Since , the BVZ has been owned and operated by the Matterhorn Gotthard Bahn (MGB), following a merger between the BVZ and the Furka Oberalp Bahn (FO).

Due to Zermatt's car free status, the MGB has a frequent special shuttle train service between Zermatt and Täsch, where people travelling to and from Zermatt by combustion-engined vehicles are required to park their vehicles.  For most of most days, this service operates at 20-minute intervals.  The MGB also operates regional services between Zermatt and Brig via Täsch at hourly intervals.

Every day, several Glacier Express trains, which are operated at this point by the MGB, pass through Täsch, but do not stop there.

Services
The following services stop at Zermatt:

 Regio:
 shuttle service every twenty minutes to Zermatt.

See also

Matterhorn Gotthard Bahn
Brig-Visp-Zermatt railway
Täsch
Zermatt
Matterhorn

References

Notes

Further reading

External links
 
 Matterhorn Gotthard Bahn 
 Matterhorn Terminal AG - information about Zermatt shuttle trains

Matterhorn Gotthard Bahn stations
Railway stations in the canton of Valais
Railway stations in Switzerland opened in 1891